Racism in Russia appears mainly in the form of negative attitudes and actions by some Russians toward non-ethnic Russian citizens, immigrants or tourists. Traditionally Russian racism includes anti-Semitism and Tatarophobia, as well as hostility towards the various peoples of the Caucasus, Central Asia, East Asia and Africa. 

According to the United Nations, Russia's immigrant population is the world's third-largest, numbering over 11.6 million. Due to the country's declining population, and the low birth rates and high death rates of ethnic Russians, the Russian government has tried to increase immigration to the country in the last decade; which has led to millions of migrants flow into Russia from mainly post-Soviet states, many of whom are illegal and remain undocumented.

Under serious police pressure, the number of racist acts started to decline in Russia from 2009. In 2016, it was reported that Russia had seen an “impressive" decrease in hate crimes.

Xenophobia

In the late 19th century, especially after nationalistic uprisings occurred in Poland, the government expressed xenophobia in its hostility towards ethnic minorities which did not speak Russian. The government decided to reduce the use of other languages, and it insisted that minorities which did not speak Russian should be Russified. 

By the beginning of the 20th century, most European Jews lived in the so-called Pale of Settlement, the Western frontier of the Russian Empire which generally consisted of the modern-day countries of Poland, Lithuania, Belarus and neighboring regions. Many pogroms accompanied the Revolution of 1917 and the ensuing civil war, an estimated 70,000 to 250,000 Jewish civilians were killed in atrocities which were committed throughout the former Russian Empire; the number of Jewish orphans exceeded 300,000.

In the 2000s, tens of thousands of people joined neo-Nazi groups inside Russia. Racism against both the Russian citizens (peoples of the Caucasus, indigenous peoples of Siberia and Russian Far East, etc.) and non-Russian citizens of Africans, Central Asians, East Asians (Vietnamese, Chinese, etc.) and Europeans (Ukrainians, etc.) is a significant problem.

In 2016, Radio Free Europe/Radio Liberty reported that "Researchers who track xenophobia in Russia have recorded an "impressive" decrease in hate crimes because the authorities appear to have stepped up pressure on far-right groups".

Using information which was collected during surveys which were conducted in 1996, 2004, and 2012, Hannah S. Chapman, et al. reports a steady increase in Russians' negative attitudes towards seven outgroups. Muscovites especially became more xenophobic.

Public sentiments and politics

In 2006, Amnesty International reported that racism in Russia was "out of control." Russia also has one of the highest immigration rates in Eastern Europe.

Between 2004 and 2008, there were more than 350 racist murders, and Verkhovsky, the leader of the anti-racist SOVA organization, estimated that around 50% of Russians thought that ethnic minorities should be expelled from their region. Vladimir Putin meanwhile was deeply critical of the view that Russia should be "for ethnic Russians", citing the need to maintain harmony in a multiethnic federation. Western commentators have noted that during this period, racist and ultranationalist groups may have been the most significant right-wing opposition to Putin's government.

On 20 April 2011, Konstantin Poltoranin, spokesman for Federal Migratory Service, was fired after saying the "survival of the white race was at stake."

On 24 October 2013, speaking during the Poedinok programme on the Rossia 1 television channel, the leader of Russia's extreme nationalist Liberal Democratic Party of Russia, Vladimir Zhirinovsky, known for his headline-grabbing outbursts, called for imposing limits on the birth rate in the Muslim-dominated North Caucasus region of Russia, and restricting the movement of people from that region across the country. These outbursts occurred shortly after the terrorist attack in Volgograd, which left several Russians dead. Zhirinovsky later apologized for his words.
During the programme, there was a live population poll conducted via text messaging and the internet. Zhirinovsky won that popular vote, with over 140 thousand Russians voting in favour of him. Some Russian nationalists believe the best way to stop the uptick in Muslim migration is by using oppressive tactics to "stem the tide". In 2006, in the town of Kondopoga, Karelian republic, a brawl in a café involving Chechen migrants and local Russians turned into a massive riot that lasted for several days.

Racism by targeted group

Africans

Official attitudes towards African people were nominally neutral during the Soviet Union, because of its internationalist agenda. As a part of its support of decolonization of Africa, the Soviet Union offered free education for selected citizens of African states. However, once in the Soviet Union, these students experienced everyday racism directed at them from all classes of society. In 1963, Moscow was the site of spontaneous protests which saw African students protest the murder of a black man, who was killed by a family of a Russian woman he was dating.

In 2006, some exchange students claimed, "monkey" insults were so frequent that students ceased reporting them.

In 2010, Jean Sagbo became the first black man in Russia to be elected to government.

In 2013, Member of Duma Irina Rodnina has publicly posted a picture showing Obama with a banana on Twitter.

A Tatar owned supermarket in Tatarstan sold calendars with images of American president Obama depicted as a monkey and initially refused to apologize for selling the calendar. They were then forced to issue an apology later.

In mid-2016, after tensions rose between the US and Russia, a Tatarstan ice cream factory produced "Obamka" (little Obama) ice cream with packaging showing a black child wearing an earring; the move was seen as an illustration of both anti-Americanism in Russia and enduring, Soviet-era racism in the country. The company, which stated that the ice cream was not intended to be political, halted production of the line shortly after the controversy arose.

Crimean Tatars 
Tatarophobia towards Crimean Tatars was state-enforced during the Soviet era through the racially-based special settlement system, which confined the deported Crimean Tatar nation in small perimeters within Central Asia and the Mari ASSR and deprived them of a variety of civil liberties that other peoples had. While no longer officially a state-mandated institution, prejudice and negative attitudes against Crimean Tatars remain pervasive throughout government and society; a notable example being when Russian consul Vladimir Andreev demanded that none of the invited Russian citizens attend the debut of Haytarma, a film about Crimean Tatar twice Hero of the Soviet Union Amet-khan Sultan, claiming that the film could not possibly be accurate because it was directed by a Crimean Tatar.

Peoples of the Caucasus

In Russia, the word "Caucasian" is a collective term referring to anyone descended from the native ethnic groups of the Caucasus. In Russian slang, Peoples of the Caucasus are called black; this name-calling comes from their relatively darker features. While the word black in itself is not racist, the racist synonym for it is "chernozhopy" (черножо́пый, trans. black ass). (This word is also used against Black African peoples) Since the dissolution of the Soviet Union, the rise of the Muslim population in Russia and the Second Chechen War, many Russian radical nationalists have associated Islam and Muslims with terrorism and domestic crimes. In 2010 Julia Ioffe wrote that this was similar to stereotyping faced by Italian Americans in historical eras.

On 21 April 2001, there was a pogrom in a market in Moscow's Yasenevo District against merchants from the Caucasus. Ethnically motivated attacks against Armenians in Russia have grown so common that the president of Armenia, Robert Kocharyan, raised the issue with high-ranking Russian officials. In September 2006, major ethnic tensions between Russians and Caucasians took place in Kondopoga. In 2006, the crisis in Georgia–Russia relations resulted in the deportation of Georgians from Russia. The Russian side explained the process as law enforcement towards illegal immigrants, whereas the Georgian government accused Russia of ethnic cleansing. The European Court of Human Rights concluded that the detention and collective expulsion of Georgian nationals in 2006 violated the European Convention of Human Rights and ruled, in 2019, that Russia had to pay 10 million Euros in compensation.

In December 2010, there was a massive outbreak of hostility towards Caucasians, culminating in nationalist protests at Manezhnaya Square in Moscow and in other cities. The trigger was the murder of Egor Sviridov, a Russian association football fan, in a street fight on 6 December. On 11 December, thousands of nationalist rioters, outside the Moscow Kremlin building, screamed racist phrases, cried for a "Russia for Russians" and a "Moscow for Muscovites," attacked Caucasians and other minority groups who passed by, and some – including children as young as fourteen – made the Nazi salute. The next day, a similar riot was held in Rostov-on-Don, and afterwards, the city's government banned Caucasians from performing Lezginka, their traditional dance, in the city. Later, the police chief in Moscow said that civil liberties were a hindrance in security and that migration should be restricted. Vladimir Kvachkov, a major Russian nationalist leader of the organization People's Liberation Front of Russia (which says its major goal is to "free" Russia from Caucasian and Hebrew "occupiers"), made the following statement: "We Russian nationalists, the initiators of the people's front, we are telling you that the events of 11 December are the beginning of the revolutionary changes in Russia, the first outbursts of the approaching Russian revolution... You are the ones who can participate in it."

People of Central Asia
In 2016, Kyrgyzstan's President Almazbek Atambayev urged Russians to show respect to his countrymen after an assault on two migrants in Moscow. Racial discrimination of work-migrants from Central Asians (called gastarbeiters, rus. гастарбайтеры) became a systematic norm after the fall of the Soviet Union.

Jews

On 11 January 2006, Alexander Koptsev burst into Bolshaya Bronnaya Synagogue in Moscow and stabbed eight people with a knife. In March, he was sentenced to 13 years in prison. In 2008, allegations of blood libel appeared in posters in Novosibirsk. The Federation of Jewish Communities of Russia expressed their concern about a rising number of attacks targeting Jews, calling it part of "a recent surge in anti-Semitic manifestations" in Russia.

In 2019, Ilya Yablogov wrote that many Russians were keen on antisemitic conspiracy theories in 1990s but it declined after 2000 and many high-ranking officials were forced to apologize for the antisemitic behavior.

The 2019 Pew Research poll found that 18% of Russians held unfavorable views of Jews, the number has dropped from 34% in 2009.

Vietnamese

Amid hostility towards migrant workers, around 600 Vietnamese were rounded up in Moscow and placed in tents while waiting to be deported from Russia in August 2013.

On 9 January 2009 a group of strangers in Moscow stabbed a Vietnamese student named Tang Quoc Binh who was 21 years old and the wounds were fatal resulting in his death on 10 January.

In October 2004 Russian skinheads stabbed and beat a Vietnamese student named Vu Anh Tuan, killing him. Vu Anh Tuan was 20 years old when he was killed in St. Petersburg. In October 2006 the 17 skinheads who were on trial for his murder were acquitted by a court.

In 2005 in Moscow, three Russians stabbed a 45-year-old Vietnamese man named Quan to death.

A protest was held by 100 Vietnamese against the murder of Vu Anh Tuan, and a protestor said "We came to study in this country, which we thought was a friend of Vietnam. We do not have drunken fights, we do not steal, we do not sell drugs and we have the right to protection from bandits".

In Moscow on 25 December 2004 a crowd of people used clubs and knives to attack 2 Vietnamese students at the Moscow Energy Institute, Nguyen Tuan Anh and Nguyen Hoang Anh and they suffered severe injuries and were hospitalized.

Association football

After it was announced that Russia will host 2018 FIFA World Cup, a head of UEFA FARE Monitoring Centre, Dr. Rafał Pankowski, accused the Russian Football Union of downplaying racist chants in stadiums, saying: "Nazi slogans are common in many Russian stadiums. Matches are often interrupted with racist chants aimed at black players." More than 100 incidents took place 2012–2014.

Cameroonian player André Amougou constantly suffered racism while playing for Lokomotiv Moscow. As Zenit Saint Petersburg kicked off their 2006/2007 Russian Premier League campaign against visitors Saturn Moscow Oblast, Brazilian footballer Antônio Géder was received with a chorus of monkey chants at Petrovsky Stadium. In March 2008, black players of French side Marseille — including André Ayew, Charles Kaboré and Ronald Zubar — were targeted by ultras of Zenit Saint Petersburg. Zenit ultras were later warned by police in Manchester not to repeat their behaviour ahead of the 2008 UEFA Cup Final. Zenit's coach Dick Advocaat revealed that when they attempted to sign Mathieu Valbuena, a Frenchman, many fans asked "Is he a negro?" Also Serge Branco, who played for Krylia Sovetov Samara, accused Zenit's staff of racism, saying: "Each time I play in St Petersburg I have to listen to racist insults from the stands. Zenit bosses do not do anything about it which makes me think they are racists too." On 20 August 2010, Peter Odemwingie of Lokomotiv Moscow signed a 3-year contract with Premier League team West Bromwich Albion. Later, photographs showed Lokomotiv Moscow fans celebrating the sale of Odemwingie through the use of racist banners, including the image of a banana with the text "Thanks West Brom".

On 21 March 2011, during a game away at Zenit Saint Petersburg, a banana was held by one of the fans near Roberto Carlos of Russian Premier League club Anzhi Makhachkala as the footballer was taking part in a flag-raising ceremony. In June, in a match away at Krylia Sovetov Samara, Roberto Carlos received a pass from the goalkeeper and was about to pass it when a banana was thrown onto the pitch, landing nearby.

Lokomotiv Moscow was involved in another incident on 18 March 2012, when a banana was thrown at Anzhi Makhachkala defender Christopher Samba during at a match at the Lokomotiv Stadium.

In October 2013, during the second half of the match, between Manchester City and PFC CSKA Moscow, Yaya Touré, a star midfielder for City from Ivory Coast, walked up to the referee, Ovidiu Hategan, and angrily pointed at CSKA fans making monkey chants and shouting abuse toward him and his black teammates. The game continued and, according to Touré, so did the abuse.

Notable hate crimes 
On 9 February 2004, a group of neo-Nazi skinheads stabbed a nine-year-old Tajik girl, Khursheda Sultanova, to death in Saint Petersburg. In 2006, the Saint Petersburg Agency for Journalistic Investigations revealed suspected perpetrators among the members of the "Mad Crowd" gang.

On 14 June 2011, the Saint Petersburg City Court sentenced 12 members of the gang led by Alexei Voevodin and Artyom Prokhorenko for their roles in dozens of racist attacks.

On 15 December 2008, Artur Ryno and Pavel Skachevsky were sentenced to penal labour for 10 years each for the murder of 19 foreigners. They were placed on the list of people banned from entering the United Kingdom, remaining the only Russians on the list. The reason given is that they are "Leaders of a violent gang that beat migrants and posted films of their attacks on the internet. Considered to be engaging in unacceptable behaviour by fomenting serious criminal activity and seeking to provoke others to serious criminal acts." A judge who conducted the trial, Eduard Chuvashov, was gunned down on 12 April 2010, four days after he added two years to the 20-year prison sentence of a member of their gang.

Murder of anti-fascist activists
On 19 June 2004, Nikolai Girenko, a prominent ethnologist and adviser in 15 ethnic hate crime trials, was shot to death in his Saint Petersburg apartment. On 14 June 2011, members of neo-Nazi gang Mad Crowd were sentenced to jail for a number of killings including Girenko.
On 13 November 2005, murder of Timur Kacharava, a Russian anti-fascist of Georgian descent took place. On 7 August 2007, Alexander Shabalin was sentenced to 12 years in prison for his murder.
On 19 January 2009, while leaving a news conference, a human rights lawyer and journalist Stanislav Markelov was gunned down in Moscow. Anastasia Baburova, a journalist for Novaya Gazeta who tried to come to Markelov's assistance, was also shot and killed in the attack. On 6 May 2011, the court sentenced two radical nationalists, Nikita Tikhonov and his girlfriend Yevgenia Khasis, to life imprisonment and 18 years in prison, respectively.
On 16 November 2009, Ivan Khutorskoy, former punk singer and head of security for anti-fascist shows, was killed in a suburb of Moscow. He was known for organizing self-defense classes for anti-fascists individuals and providing security at press conferences of Stanislav Markelov.

Cherkizovsky Market bombing

On 21 August 2006, a home-made bomb exploded in Moscow at the Cherkizovsky Market, which is frequented by foreign merchants. On 15 May 2008, eight people of Russian radical nationalist organization Spas were found guilty for their roles in the attack that left 14 dead. Semyon Charny from the Moscow Bureau for Human Rights says: "The fact that this case found its way to court, and the example of people sentenced to life for the Cherkizovo market blast shows that we are moving in the right direction – but there's still a lot to do."

Execution of a Tajik and a Dagestani
Execution of a Tajik and a Dagestani is a video clip that was distributed in the Russian Internet segment in August 2007, showing the beheading of a Russian citizen of Dagestani origin and the shooting of a Tajik immigrant by Russian neo-nazis.

The video sparked active discussions in the Russian media. On 17 March 2008, the District Court of Novgorod ruled the video as extremist, and banned its distribution in the Russian Federation.

The video was posted on behalf of the National Socialist Party of Rus' on the personal livejournal blog of Adygean college student Viktor Milnikov.
After a few days, he was arrested and later sentenced to one year of corrective labour by Maykop court.

On 5 June 2008, scenes of decapitation on video were identified as authentic by the Russian Investigation Committee. On the same day, one of the victims on the footage was identified by his relatives as Shamil Odamanov, a native of Dagestan.

See also

Notes

References

Further reading

Victor Schnirelmann,  «Чистильщики московских улиц»: скинхеды, СМИ и общественное мнение. ["Sweepers of Moscow Streets": Skinheads, Media, and Popular Opinion] М.: Academia, 2007. 116 стр.

External links

Non-governmental organizations
Racism and xenophobia analyses by SOVA Center
Report by Moscow Helsinki Group
Information on ethnic discrimination by Memorial
Multimedia
Intolerance and Discrimination in Today's Russia, a panel discussion at the CSIS
From Russia With Hate, a documentary from Vanguard TV series

 
Russia
Russia
Russia